Ψ-DOM, or 2,6-dimethoxy-4-methylamphetamine, is a hallucinogenic, psychedelic drug and a structural isomer of the better-known hallucinogen DOM. Ψ-DOM was first reported by Alexander Shulgin in his book PiHKAL.

Ψ-DOM has similar effects to DOM, but is only around one third to one half the potency, with an active dose reported to be between 15-25 milligrams. The effects of Ψ-DOM last for around six to eight hours.

The activity of Ψ-DOM (and Ψ-2C-T-4) demonstrates that the two methoxy groups on the psychedelic phenethylamines are not strictly limited to the 2,5-positions on the phenyl ring. Indeed, any of the 2Cx or DOx series of drugs could alternatively be made as the 2,6-isomer and would still be expected to show similar activity, although slightly less potent. In theory this would vastly expand the range of different hallucinogens that could be derived from this family of drugs. The 2,6-isomer of another similar drug 2C-D-FLY (see 2C-B-FLY) has also been made by David E. Nichols and found to be active, this might by extension be referred to as Ψ-2C-D-FLY.

References 

Substituted amphetamines